This is a list of few flyovers in different cities of Pakistan.

Flyovers in Karachi

There are 50 flyovers in Karachi as on 8th July 2020. These are traffic flyovers over the road intersections. This list does NOT include bridges over river/ naalah & bridges over railway lines. 

 Liaqatabad Flyover.
 Banaras Flyover. 
 Jinnah Flyover.
 Gizri Flyover.
 Nipa Flyover.
 Nagan Chowrangi interchange.
 Sohrab Goth interchange.
 Afza Altaf Flyover.
 Quaidabad Flyover.
 Jinnah hospital interchange.
 Jail chowrangi Flyover.
 PAF chapter Flyover
 KPT interchange.
 FTC Flyover.
 Baloch Colony Flyover.
 Gulshan Chowrangi Flyover.
 Nursery Flyover.
 Tipu Sultan Flyover, Shahrah-e-Faisal (Fauzia Wahab Flyover).
 Johar Flyover.
 Karsaz Flyover.
 PAF base faisal Flyover.
 Drig road Flyover.
 Shah Faisal colony Flyover, Shahrah-e-Faisal.
 Hassan Square interchange.
 MT Khan Road Flyover.
 Sir syed university, University road Flyover.
 Samama Flyover, University road.
 Abul Hsasan Isphahani Flyover.
 MAI convention/ Metro flyover, University road.
 Nazimabad Flyover.
 Stadium road Flyover.
 Gulbai Flyover.
 Shershah Flyover.
 Askari Flyover.
 Jinnah terminal Flyover.
 Aisha Manzil Flyover.
 Water pump Flyover.
 Daakkhana Liaqatabad Flyover.
 Teen hatti Flyover.
 Bahria flyover, Clifton.
 Malir Halt Flyover.
 Malir 15 Flyover.
 Korangi crossing Flyover.
 Manzil pump Flyover, Landhi.
 Abdul Sattar Edhi Interchange, Board office Nazimabad. 
 Sunset Boulevard flyover, Clifton.
 Tipu Sultan Road Flyover (Shaheed e millat road intersection) 
 KDA chowrangi flyover, North Nazimabad.
 Five star chowrangi flyover, North Nazimabad.
 Sakhi Hassan chowrangi flyover, North Nazimabad.

Underpasses:  The first underpass for traffic was constructed in 2005 in Karachi, the KPT underpass in clifton. Here is the list of underpasses in Karachi.

 KPT underpass, Clifton.
 Nazimabad underpass.
 Liaqatabad underpass.
 Ghareebabad underpass.
 Sohrab goth underpass.
 Shahrah-e-Quaideen underpass.
 Bahria town underpass 1, Clifton (Iran road).
 Bahria town underpass 2, Clifton (icon tower).
 Hotel Mehran underpass.
 Golimar underpass, Nazimabad No 1.
 Drigh road underpass.
 Submarine chowk underpass, Clifton.
 Tariq road underpass (Shaheed-e-millat road)
 Bahria Town underpass 1 on Motorway M9 interchange
 Bahria Town underpass 2 on Motorway M9 interchange
 Bahria Town underpass 3 on Motorway M9 interchange
 Hill park roundabout underpass (Shaheed-e-millat road)

Flyovers in Hyderabad 
 Latifabad Flyover
 Hosh Muhammad Shedi flyover
 Ghulam Shah Kalhoro flyover
 Sakhi Abdul Wahab flyover
 Thandi Sadak Flyover
 Nazeer Hussain Flyover
 Shahbaz Qalander Flyover

Flyovers in Lahore

Flyovers in Gujrat 
Sargodah Road Flyover

Shaheen Chowk Flyover

Rehmania Flyover

Service Moor Flyover (Under Construction)

G.T. Road Flyover (Under Construction)

Khatala Phatak Flyover (Under Construction)

Flyovers in Peshawar 
Mufti Mehmood Flyover

Malik Saad Shaheed Flyover

Bab-E-Khyber Flyover

Faqeerabad Flyover

Gulbahar Flyover

Motorway/ Ring Road Flyover

GT Road/ Ring Road Flyover

Ring Road/ Charsadda Road Flyover

Ring Road/ Kohat Road Flyover

Flyovers in Multan

 Kachehri Chowk Flyover
 Sher Shah Interchange Two Flyovers 
 Chungi No 7 & 8 Flyover (with an extra ramp to Gulgasht Colony)
 Chowk Kumharanwala Level II Flyover (Grade Separated)(First of its kind in Province of Punjab)
 Yousuf Raza Gillani Flyover (Longest Flyover in Multan with three extra ramps)
 Nishtar Chowk Flyover
 Pul Moj Darya Flyover, Kalma Chowk
 Rasheedabad Flyover
 Madni Chowk Chowk Flyover

Flyovers in Islamabad/Rawalpindi 

 Faizabad Interchange, Islamabad Expressway 
 Zero Point Interchange, Islamabad Expressway
 I-8 Interchange, Islamabad Expressway
 Faisal Avenue Flyover, Islamabad
 Peshawar Morr Interchange, Islamabad
 Koral Interchange, Islamabad Expressway
 Gulberg Interchange, Islamabad Expressway
 Naval Anchorage Interchange, Islamabad Expressway
 Sohan Interchange, Islamabad Expressway
 Khanna Interchange, Islamabad expressway
 PWD Interchange, Islamabad Expressway
 Rawal Chowk Flyover, Islamabad
 6th road Flyover, Rawalpindi
 Chandni Chowk Flover, Rawalpindi, 
 Pirwadahi Morr Flyover, Rawalpindi
 Airport road Flyover, Rawalpindi

Flyovers
Lists of buildings and structures in Pakistan

References